Brian or Bryan Cook or Cooke may refer to:

Entertainment
Brian Cooke (born 1937), British comedy writer
Brian W. Cook, British film director, assistant director, producer and actor
Bryan Cook (musician), member of the American rock band Hindu Love Gods
Brian Cook (bassist) (born 1977), American bassist currently in Russian Circles

Sports
Brian Cook (football administrator) (born 1955), Australian football administrator
Brian Cook (basketball) (born 1980), American basketball player
Bryan Cook (American football) (born 1999), American football safety

Other people
Sir Bryan Cooke, 4th Baronet (1684–1734), of the Cooke baronets
Sir Bryan Cooke, 6th Baronet (1717–1766), of the Cooke baronets
Sir Brian Batsford (1910–1991), British MP who worked as an illustrator under the name Brian Cook